These are the albums which have reached number one on the Folk Albums chart in Billboard Magazine, listed in chronological order.

References

External links
 

Americana Folk Albums 2010s
United States Americana Folk Albums